University Line may refer to:
University Line (UTA TRAX) in Salt Lake City
University Line (METRORail) in Houston (planned)
University/4th Street Line in Minneapolis (planned)
Yonge–University line in Toronto